Bandio is a small town in the Bagassi Department of Balé Province in southern Burkina Faso. The town has a population of 1176.

References

External links
Satellite map at Maplandia.com

Balé Province
Populated places in the Boucle du Mouhoun Region